Commodore William Farquharson Burnett,  (1815 – 7 February 1863) was a senior officer in the Royal Navy.

Naval career
Burnett was appointed a lieutenant in the Royal Navy in 1838. Promoted to captain in 1854, he commanded Tortoise at Ascension. He served as Governor of Ascension from 1858 until 1861. He was then the Commander-in-Chief, Australia Station, between 21 July 1862 until 7 February 1863. He drowned when HMS Orpheus was wrecked and sank off the west coast of Auckland, New Zealand, on 7 February 1863.

References

Bastock, John (1988), Ships on the Australia Station, Child & Associates Publishing Pty Ltd; Frenchs Forest, Australia.

See also
 
 

1837 births
1863 deaths
Administrators of Ascension Island
Companions of the Order of the Bath
Royal Navy officers
Royal Navy personnel of the Crimean War